Paul Robert Draper (born 19 May 1972) is an English cricketer. He is a right-handed batsman who bowls slow left-arm orthodox.  He was born at Southampton, Hampshire.

Draper made his Minor Counties Championship debut for Wiltshire in 1997 against Berkshire.  From 1997 to 2001, he represented the county in 10 Minor Counties Championship matches, the last of which came against Cornwall.  Draper also represented Wiltshire in the MCCA Knockout Trophy.  His debut in that competition came against Norfolk in 1997.  From 1997 to 2003, he represented the county in 12 Trophy matches, the last of which came against Buckinghamshire.

Draper also represented Wiltshire in 2 List-A matches.  His debut List-A match came against Herefordshire in the 1999 NatWest Trophy.  His second and final List-A match came against Ireland in the 1st round 2002 Cheltenham & Gloucester Trophy which was played in 2001.  In his 2 List-A matches, he scored 12 runs at a batting average of 6.00, with a high score of 10.

Draper currently plays club cricket for South Wiltshire Cricket Club in the Southern Premier Cricket League.

References

External links
Paul Draper at Cricinfo
Paul Draper at CricketArchive

1972 births
Living people
Cricketers from Southampton
English cricketers
Wiltshire cricketers